Vladimir Novikov (born 14 April 1960, Glazov, Udmurt Autonomous Soviet Socialist Republic) is a Russian political figure and a deputy of the 1st State Duma. After graduating from the Kirov Polytechnic Institute in 1985, he started working as a commercial director at the Stalker LLP. In 1993, he ran with the Liberal Democratic Party of Russia for the 1st State Duma where he joined the environmental committee and co-authored two legislative initiatives and amendments to draft federal laws.

References
 

 

1960 births
Living people
United Russia politicians
21st-century Russian politicians
First convocation members of the State Duma (Russian Federation)